Tauraroa is a locality in Northland, New Zealand. Whangārei is to the northeast. Maungakaramea is about 5 km northwest. Waiotira is about 9 km southwest. The North Auckland railway line passes through Tauraroa, and the Tauraroa River flows past.

Demographics

The statistical area of Oakleigh-Mangapai, which at 324 square kilometres is much larger than this locality, also includes Oakleigh, Maungakaramea and Waiotira. It had a population of 2,310 at the 2018 New Zealand census, an increase of 105 people (4.8%) since the 2013 census, and an increase of 303 people (15.1%) since the 2006 census. There were 879 households. There were 1,155 males and 1,158 females, giving a sex ratio of 1.0 males per female. Of the total population, 444 people (19.2%) were aged up to 15 years, 345 (14.9%) were 15 to 29, 1,182 (51.2%) were 30 to 64, and 339 (14.7%) were 65 or older. Figures may not add up to the total due to rounding.

Ethnicities were 90.0% European/Pākehā, 18.7% Māori, 2.2% Pacific peoples, 1.6% Asian, and 2.1% other ethnicities. People may identify with more than one ethnicity.

The percentage of people born overseas was 14.5, compared with 27.1% nationally.

Although some people objected to giving their religion, 64.7% had no religion, 24.7% were Christian, and 2.5% had other religions.

Of those at least 15 years old, 270 (14.5%) people had a bachelor or higher degree, and 363 (19.5%) people had no formal qualifications. The median income was $32,300. The employment status of those at least 15 was that 987 (52.9%) people were employed full-time, 339 (18.2%) were part-time, and 51 (2.7%) were unemployed.

Education
Tauraroa Area School is a coeducational composite (years 1–13) school with a roll of  students as of 
Before 1958, the school was "Tauraroa Public School". Between 1958 and 1983, it was "Tauraroa District High School".

Notes

External links
 Tauraroa Area School website
 Tauraroa Area School on Facebook

Whangarei District
Populated places in the Northland Region